Ai River may refer to:
* Love River, Taiwanese canal
 Ai River (Gifu), Japan
 Ai River (Dandong), China

See also 
 Ai (disambiguation)